A general election was held in the U.S. state of Minnesota on November 3, 2020. All seats in the Minnesota Senate and Minnesota House of Representatives were up for election as well as several judicial seats, Minnesota's 10 presidential electors, a United States Senate seat, Minnesota's eight seats in the United States House of Representatives, and several positions for local offices. A primary election to nominate major party candidates and several judicial and local primary elections were held on August 11, 2020.

Electoral system
Elections for state and federal offices were held via first-past-the-post voting. The candidate or bloc of presidential electors that wins the most votes will be elected. Nominations for parties with major party status—the DFL, Grassroots-Legalize Cannabis, Legal Marijuana Now, and Republican parties—were determined by an open primary election. The candidate that won the most votes in each party became their party's nominee for the general election. If only a single candidate sought the nomination for each party, a primary election for that office was not held.

Judicial and several local elections will be held via a nonpartisan blanket primary. Each voter had up to as many votes as there are positions to be filled. Voters could vote for a candidate not more than once. The top number of candidates that won the most votes in the primary election that was twice the number of positions to be filled advanced to the general election. If not more than twice the number of candidates to be elected sought election, a primary election was not held. Most cities, school districts, and all townships and hospital districts did not hold a primary election—instead all candidates appeared at the general election. The top number of candidates that win the most votes in the general election that is equal to the number of positions to be filled will be elected. Judicial and local elections are nonpartisan.

The candidate filing period was from May 19 to June 2, 2020. The filing period for cities, townships, school districts, and hospital districts that did not hold a primary election was from July 28 to August 11, 2020.

State elections

Legislative elections

Minnesota Senate

All 67 seats in the Minnesota Senate were up for election. The Republicans hold a majority of 35 seats and the DFL hold 32 seats. The Republicans have held a majority in the Senate since the 2016 election.

Minnesota House of Representatives

All 134 seats in the Minnesota House of Representatives were up for election. The DFL hold a majority of 75 seats and the Republicans hold 59 seats. The DFL have held a majority in the House since the 2018 election.

Judicial elections 
One seat on the Minnesota Supreme Court was up for election. Justice Paul Thissen was up for his first election following his appointment in 2018 by Governor Mark Dayton. Four seats on the Minnesota Court of Appeals and several seats on the Minnesota District Courts were also up for election.

Federal elections

President 

Minnesota's 10 electors in the Electoral College were up for election, who will subsequently cast votes for president and vice president on December 14, 2020.

Minnesota has voted for the Democratic nominee in every presidential election since 1976, the longest streak of any U.S. state as of the 2016 election. The Democratic nominee in 2016, Hillary Clinton, won Minnesota by less than two percentage points over Republican nominee Donald Trump.

United States Senate

Minnesota's class 2 United States Senate seat was up for election. Incumbent DFL Senator Tina Smith was originally appointed in 2018 by Governor Mark Dayton to replace Senator Al Franken after he resigned. Smith won a special election and is seeking election to her first full term in the Senate. The DFL has held Minnesota's class 2 U.S. Senate seat since 2009 when Al Franken defeated Republican incumbent Norm Coleman after a protracted recount following the 2008 election. Lieutenant Governor Tina Smith was appointed in January 2018 by Governor Mark Dayton to replace Franken after he resigned following sexual harassment allegations. Smith won her first election in the 2018 special election.

Former U.S. Representative Jason Lewis is the Republican nominee. Other candidates include Legal Marijuana Now Party candidate Kevin O'Connor and Grassroots-Legalize Cannabis Party candidate Oliver Steinberg. Candidates who lost the primary election for the Republican nomination included John Berman, Bob Carney, Cynthia Gail, and James Reibestein. Candidates who lost the primary election for the DFL nomination included Steve Carlson, Ahmad Hassan, Paula Overby, and Christopher Seymore.

United States House of Representatives

Minnesota's eight seats in the United States House of Representatives were up for election. The DFL hold five seats and the Republicans hold three seats.

Local elections 
Elections for several subdivisions were held—including elections for counties, municipalities, school districts, and hospital districts.

Counties
All 87 counties held regular elections. 37 counties held primary elections. Five counties also held special elections on the day of the general election. Kanabec County had a ballot question on the day of the general election.

All counties held elections for:

 Half of the members of the county board of commissioners (including 1 special election)

Some counties held elections for one or more of the following:

 Half of the members of the soil and water conservation district board of supervisors (All counties except Hennepin and Ramsey, including 4 special elections)
 Half of the members of the Three Rivers Park District board of commissioners (Hennepin County excluding Minneapolis)
Ballot question (Kanabec County)

Municipalities
829 cities and 656 townships held regular elections. 32 cities held primary elections. 101 cities and 51 townships held special elections. Bemidji and Minneapolis each held a special election on the day of the primary election. All other special elections were held on the day of the general election. Bloomington, Minneapolis, and Minnetonka did not have regularly scheduled elections, but each had one or more ballot questions on the day of the general election. Jeffers had a ballot question on the day of the primary election. 22 cities and 12 townships had one or more ballot questions on the day of the general election.

Cities held elections for one or more of the following:

 Mayor (735 cities, including 7 special elections)
 Half of the members of the city council (826 cities and 94 special elections in 94 cities)
 Clerk-treasurer (9 cities, including 2 special elections)
 Clerk (32 cities, including 1 special election)
 Treasurer (34 cities, including 1 special election)
 Half of the members of the public works/utilities/sanitary district board of directors (4 cities)
Ballot questions (23 cities)

Townships held elections for one or more of the following:

 Half of the members of the town board of supervisors (655 townships and 32 special elections in 31 townships)
 Clerk-treasurer (24 townships, including 1 special election)
 Clerk (331 townships, including 12 special elections)
 Treasurer (218 townships, including 8 special elections)
Ballot questions (12 townships)

School districts
294 school districts held regular elections to elect half of the members of their board of directors. Minneapolis and Red Lake each held a primary election. Barnesville, Duluth, Fridley, Orono, Prinsburg, Rush City, and Saint Paul did not have regularly scheduled elections, but each held a special election or had one or more ballot questions on the day of the general election. 28 other school districts also held a special election on the day of the general election. Ely, Gibbon-Fairfax-Winthrop, and McGregor each had one or more ballot questions on the day of the primary election. 43 school districts had one or more ballot questions on the day of the general election.

Hospital districts
14 hospital districts held regular elections to elect half of the members of their board of directors. Two hospital districts also held special elections on the day of the general election.

References

Further reading

External links
Elections & Voting - Minnesota Secretary of State
 
 
  (State affiliate of the U.S. League of Women Voters)
 

 
Minnesota